Splendrillia resplendens is a species of sea snail, a marine gastropod mollusk in the family Drilliidae.

Description

Distribution
This marine species occurs in the Persian Gulf and the Gulf of Oman.

References

  Tucker, J.K. 2004 Catalog of recent and fossil turrids (Mollusca: Gastropoda). Zootaxa 682:1–1295.

External links
 Melvill & Standen (1901) Mollusks from the Persian Gulf and Arabian Sea; Proceedings of the Zoological Society of London.  v. 2, 1901

resplendens
Gastropods described in 1898